Lepidium puberulum is an annual herb in the family Brassicaceae, endemic to the west coast of Western Australia. The species has white or green flowers that appear from July to November (mid winter to late spring) in its native range.

References
 

puberulum
Rosids of Western Australia
Plants described in 1845
Taxa named by Alexander von Bunge